An optical line termination (OLT), also called an optical line terminal, is a device which serves as the service provider endpoint of a passive optical network. It provides two main functions:
 to perform conversion between the electrical signals used by the service provider's equipment and the fiber optic signals used by the passive optical network.  
 to coordinate the multiplexing between the conversion devices on the other end of that network (called either optical network terminals or optical network units).

The diagram below depicts an OLT within a fiber-optic network.

Features
OLTs include the following features:
 A downstream frame processing means for receiving and churning an Asynchronous Transfer Mode cell to generate a downstream frame, and converting a parallel data of the downstream frame into a serial data thereof.
 A wavelength division multiplexing means for performing an electro/optical conversion of the serial data of the downstream frame and performing a wavelength division multiplexing thereof.
 An upstream frame processing means for extracting data from the wavelength division multiplexing means, searching an overhead field, delineating a slot boundary, and processing a physical layer operations administration and maintenance (PLOAM) cell and a divided slot separately.
 A control signal generation means for performing a media access control (MAC) protocol and generating variables and timing signals used for the downstream frame processing means and the upstream frame processing means.
 A control means for controlling the downstream frame processing means and the upstream frame processing means by using the variables and the timing signals from the control signal generation means.

Fiber-optic communications
Telecommunications equipment